Baesweiler 09 was a German association football club from the city of Baesweiler, North Rhine-Westphalia.



History
The club was established in 1909 as Superior Baesweiler and in 1920 merged with Alemannia Baesweiler to create Sportverein Baesweiler 09. The club took on SV Oidtweiler as a partner in 1922 in a union that lasted until 1933.

Between 1947–56 and 1957–64, SV played in the Amateurliga Mittelrhein (II) capturing division titles there in 1951, 1954, and 1960. Following the 1963 formation of the Bundesliga, Germany's first professional top flight league, the Amateurliga became a third division circuit. The Baesweiler club finished in last place in 1964 and was absent from the Amateurliga for a season, but immediately bounced back. They played another five seasons in the third tier before slipping again and spending two seasons in the Verbandsliga Mittelrhein (IV).

Baesweiler returned to the Amateurliga Mittelrhein where they would spend 13 of the next 15 seasons. They had a close brush with relegation in 1975 when they were beaten 3:4 by VfL Köln in a playoff, but the result was reversed on appeal. They were relegated twice – in 1982 and 1985 – but returned to what had become the Amateuroberliga Nordrhein (III) after single season absences. After another failed campaign in 1987 SV was relegated again and spent the next 8 seasons in lower level play.

In 1995, the club won its way to the Oberliga Nordrhein (IV) where they played 4 seasons as a lower-tier side before declaring bankruptcy and withdrawing from competition in 1999. A youth club known as Jugendsportverein Baesweiler 09 was formed after the bankruptcy and is still active today.

References

External links
Das deutsche Fußball-Archiv historical German domestic league tables 

Football clubs in Germany
Defunct football clubs in Germany
Defunct football clubs in North Rhine-Westphalia
Association football clubs established in 1909
Association football clubs disestablished in 1999
1909 establishments in Germany
1999 disestablishments in Germany